The 155mm L/41 T7 was an American rifled tank gun developed in 1945. The T7 was to be the main armament for the T30 Heavy Tank, but only a handful were produced due to the T30 project being cancelled after trials in the late 1940s.

The T7 used two-part separated ammunition like the 105mm T5E1 gun on the T29 Heavy Tank. It had a low velocity of only  compared to the 120mm T53 on the T34 Heavy Tank (945 m/s) and the 105mm T5E1 on the T29 Heavy Tank (945 m/s). However, the 43 kg (95 lbs) High-Explosive shell was demonstrated to have a powerful demolition effect. Testing concluded before completion when the T30 project was cancelled in the late 1940s.

Variants
 T7 - Standard model
 T7E1 - T7 modified for use with a power rammer and ejection equipment.

References

Tank guns of the United States